Paranguilla tigrina is an extinct prehistoric eel that lived during the Lutetian epoch of the Eocene, in what is now Monte Bolca.

Some of the better preserved fossils show that the living animals had complex patterns of spots.  P. tigrina and Dalpiazella brevicauda constitute the extinct family Paranguillidae.

See also

 Prehistoric fish
 List of prehistoric bony fish

References

Eocene fish
Fossils of Italy
Fossil taxa described in 1864